Carl Blair Bennett (December 7, 1915 – May 15, 2013) was an American professional basketball general manager and head coach. He was born in Rockford, Indiana and began his sports career by playing softball. Bennett was recruited by Fred Zollner in 1938 to join his staff. He coached the Fort Wayne Zollner Pistons of the National Basketball League (NBL) and then the Fort Wayne Pistons of the Basketball Association of America (BAA). for six games in 1948–49. Bennett became the franchise's general manager and served in that capacity from 1948 to 1954. Bennett endured a 15-year campaign to get Zollner inducted into the Naismith Memorial Basketball Hall of Fame, which occurred in 1999. Bennett died at the age of 97 in 2013.

References

External links
 Coaching record @ basketball-reference.com

1915 births
2013 deaths
American men's basketball coaches
Basketball coaches from Indiana
Fort Wayne Pistons head coaches
Fort Wayne Zollner Pistons coaches